Pyrausta fulvilinealis is a moth in the family Crambidae. It was described by George Hampson in 1918. It is found in Uganda. And has a wingspan of around 6.9mm on average.

References

Endemic fauna of Uganda
Moths described in 1918
fulvilinealis
Moths of Africa